The 2022 National Games of India, also known as the 36th National Games of India and informally as Gujarat 2022, was the 36th edition of the National Games of India and was held in Ahmedabad, Gandhinagar, Surat, Vadodara, Rajkot and Bhavnagar in the state of Gujarat between 29 September and 12 October 2022.

Participating teams
Teams are expected from all 28 states and eight union territories of India as well a team representing Indian Armed Forces. The new union territories of Ladakh and Dadra and Nagar Haveli and Daman and Diu made their National Games debut at these games. 

  Andaman and Nicobar Islands
  Andhra Pradesh
  Arunachal Pradesh
  Assam
  Bihar
  Chandigarh
  Chhattisgarh
  Dadra and Nagar Haveli and Daman and Diu
  Delhi 
  Goa
  Gujarat
  Haryana
 Himachal Pradesh
  Jammu and Kashmir 
  Jharkhand
  Karnataka
  Kerala
  Ladakh 
  Lakshadweep
  Madhya Pradesh
  Maharashtra
  Manipur
  Meghalaya
  Mizoram
 Nagaland
  Odisha
  Puducherry
  Punjab
  Rajasthan
  Services
  Sikkim
  Tamil Nadu
 Telangana
  Tripura
  Uttar Pradesh
  Uttarakhand
  West Bengal

Marketing
The official logo and motto of the games was unveiled on 22 July 2022. The logo depicts an Asiatic lion head make up of sporting pictograms and the Statue of Unity. The official motto of the games is "Celebrating unity through sports". The games mascot is Savaj the asiatic lion.

The curtain raiser event was held on 4 September 2022 at EKA Arena.

Venues
The games will be held across the cities of Ahmedabad, Gandhinagar, Surat, Vadodara, Rajkot and Bhavnagar. While Cycling-Track Events will be held in Indira Gandhi Cycling Velodrome, Delhi.

Ahmedabad
Narendra Modi Stadium (Opening and closing ceremonies) 
Sanskar Dham (Archery, Indian Archery, Kho Kho, Mallakhambh) 
EKA Arena (Football, Kabaddi, Rugby7s, Yogasana) 
Sabarmati Riverfront (Canoeing,Roller Sports, Rowing, Soft Tennis, Tennis) 
Kensville Golf and Country Club (Golf, Lawn Bowls) 
Crown Shooting Academy (Shooting) 
Rifle Club (Shooting) 
Shahibaug Police Stadium (Football)

Gandhinagar
IIT Gandhinagar (Athletics, Softball, Squash, Triathlon) 
Mahatma Mandir (Boxing, Fencing, Judo, Weightlifting, Wrestling, Wushu)

Surat
Dumas Beach (Beach Sports) 
PDDU Indoor Stadium (Badminton, Table Tennis)

Vadodara
Sama Sports Complex (Gymnastics)

Rajkot

Sardar Patel Swimming Complex (Aquatics) 
Dhyanchand Hockey Ground (Hockey)

Bhavnagar
Multipurpose Hall, SAG (Basketball, Netball, Volleyball)

New Delhi 
Indira Gandhi Cycling Velodrome (Track Cycling)

Sports
The sports programme will include athletics, field hockey, football, volleyball, lawn tennis, table tennis, skateboarding, Netball and judo, and will also feature traditional sports such as kabaddi, kho kho, mallakhamba, and yogasana.

Medal table

See also
 Khelo India Youth Games
 2015 National Games of India
 Khelo India University Games

References

External links
Official Website
Gujarat 2022 on Twitter

National Games of India
National Games of India
2022 National Games of India
National Games of India